Alexander Charles Antic (born 17 December 1974) is an Australian politician who has been a Senator for South Australia since 2019, representing the Liberal Party.

Early life
Antic was born in Adelaide in 1974, the son of Vicki Anderson and Ratomir Antic. In his maiden speech to parliament he stated his belief that he was the first Australian senator of Serbian descent. His father arrived in Australia from Yugoslavia in 1957 and eventually became director of thoracic medicine at Royal Adelaide Hospital.

Antic holds arts and law degrees from the University of Adelaide. Before entering politics he was a senior associate with Tindall Gask Bentley lawyers. He served on the Adelaide City Council from 2014 to 2018, representing the south ward. In this role he publicly argued that local governments must concentrate on the delivery of services, rather than "being used as a vehicle for identity politics." He also used his position on the City Council to press for the preservation of Australia Day.

Politics
Antic was elected to the Senate at the 2019 federal election, taking office on 1 July 2019. In the Liberal preselection process he had out-polled sitting senator Lucy Gichuhi, a fellow member of the party's conservative faction.

In his maiden speech in September 2019 Antic spoke of his support for the development of an Australian nuclear power industry. In November 2019 he opposed moves to decriminalise prostitution in South Australia, stating that sex workers were being exploited and that it was hypocritical to support decriminalisation while opposing the use of grid girls at the Australian Grand Prix and Clipsal 500

In November 2021, Antic was one of five Coalition senators who voted in support of One Nation’s COVID‑19 Vaccination Status (Prevention of Discrimination) Bill 2021, against the government's position.

In December 2021, it was alleged that Antic misled Prime Minister Scott Morrison about his COVID-19 vaccination status after Morrison claimed Antic had been double-vaccinated during a radio interview. Antic returned to Adelaide from Canberra having obtained a travel exemption for unvaccinated persons – the exemption having only been granted on appeal on the condition he spent 14 days in quarantine at a Medi-hotel – but on arrival he allegedly refused to provide his vaccination status to officials at Adelaide Airport, and then posted a video to social media claiming he had been "detained by overzealous bureaucrats" in what he called a "political stunt".

In a Senate estimates hearing in November 2022, Antic accused the Australian Broadcasting Corporation (ABC) of "grooming children with [...] adult content" over a Play School segment that featured drag queen Courtney Act reading a children's book. In response, Act stated that "to use terms of abuse when no abuse is actually happening, really takes away from the occasions when it is happening [...] I'm on television, reading a children’s book, there was nothing untoward about it. It was really quite a shocking thing to be accused of".

References

External links
 Alex Antic: Senate Candidate for SA

1974 births
Living people

21st-century Australian politicians
Politicians from Adelaide
Australian people of Serbian descent
Members of the Australian Senate
Members of the Australian Senate for South Australia
Liberal Party of Australia members of the Parliament of Australia
South Australian local councillors
University of Adelaide alumni